The 2004 Finnish Cup was the 50th season of the main annual association football cup competition in Finland. It was organised as a single-elimination knock–out tournament and participation in the competition was voluntary.  A total of 386 teams registered for the competition.  The final was held at the Finnair Stadium, Helsinki on 30 October 2004 with MyPa defeating FC Hämeenlinna by 2-1 before an attendance of 2,650 spectators.

Teams

Round 1

Round 2

Round 3

Round 4

Round 5

Round 6

Round 7

Quarter-finals

Semi-finals

Final

References

External links
 Suomen Cup Official site 

Finnish Cup seasons
Finnish Cup, 2004
Finnish Cup, 2004